Uvariastrum is a genus of plant in family Annonaceae. 

Every species of this genus is native to continental Africa. One species of the genus grows in a drier woodland habitat, the other species are found in the tropical lowland rain forests. It contains the following species (but this list may be incomplete):
 Uvariastrum germainii Boutique
 Uvariastrum hexaloboides R.E.Fr.
 Uvariastrum modestum Diels
 Uvariastrum neglectum Paiva
 Uvariastrum pierreanum Engl. & Diels
 Uvariastrum pynaertii De Wild.
 Uvariastrum zenkeri Engl. & Diels

References

Annonaceae
Annonaceae genera
Taxonomy articles created by Polbot